The Arran Banner is a weekly local newspaper on the Isle of Arran in Scotland. It was established in 1974 and is published on a Saturday. The paper still attracts subscribers from around the world for its often unique and witty writing style. The newspaper is renowned for often controversial and heated discussion in its letter pages. Recently this has included debates on climate change, the state of Arran's roads and the proposed new ferry service to the island.

Circulation
The newspaper is also famous for a very high readership among the local population. In 1984 it received a Guinness World Record recognising this fact. The entry reads: "The Arran Banner, founded in 1974, has a readership of more than 97 per cent in Britain’s seventh largest off-shore island". Recently The Banner was named as one of only three newspapers in Scotland with a rise in circulation. In 2015, it had a circulation of just over 3,000 copies each week.

Sale to the Oban Times group 
For many years it was under the ownership and editorship of John Millar. In 2003, the Arran Banner was purchased by the Oban Times Group, who continue to publish the newspaper today. Soon after its sale, the newspaper converted to a tabloid, colour format, from the previous A4 format. It is also now printed off the island, being printed on Thursday afternoons before arriving on the island each Friday morning. Former editor John Millar continued to write weekly Banner leader columns until 2008.

The leader column is now written by news editor Hugh Boag who joined the team in July 2013. Colin Smeeton is the other reporter working at the paper and he joined the two-man editorial team in 2015.

The newspaper's advertising department managed by Cecilia Paul.

The retail price of the newspaper increased to £1 on Friday 4 February 2022 (edition 2270) after being at 85p for the previous three years.

As well as continuing to produce the weekly edition of the newspaper the company are also responsible for a popular hand-drawn tourist map of the island and the annual Holiday Arran magazine.

The Arran Banner also has a website where some news is displayed for free but there is also a paid for section (Paywall).

References

External links 

Publications established in 1974
Newspapers published in Scotland
1974 establishments in Scotland
Isle of Arran